Hana Preinhaelterová (née Pletánková; born 12 September 1938, České Budějovice; died 24 June 2018) was a Czech Indologist and translator, specialising in the Bengali language and literature. She was well known for her Základní kurs bengálštiny (Basic course in Bengali), a set of textbooks for learning the language.

Life and career
Hana Pletánková was born in České Budějovice. In 1958, she graduated from the School of Economics in Pilsen.

She studied Bengali and English at the Charles University in Prague under Dušan Zbavitel. For her postgraduate studies, she attended Visva-Bharati University at Santiniketan in India. Based on her experiences, she published  Moje bengálské přítelkyně (My Bengali Female Friends) in 1978, which was translated to Russian, Slovak and Bengali.

From 1964, she taught the Bengali language at the Faculty of Arts of Charles University.

In 1968, she published her doctoral dissertation titled Humor v bengálské lidové literatuře (Humour in Bengali Folk Literature).

She compiled a four-part textbook of Bengali, Základní kurs bengálštiny and published in 1983. That same year, as a non-member of the Communist Party, she was purged and forced to leave Charles University when the teaching of Bengali was abolished. She taught English and Bengali at a language school in Prague till 1990, when she was able to return to the Faculty of Arts. She now focused on cultural anthropology and the interconnection of social and religious aspects in Bengali life. Her critical edition of bratas, Bengali fertility rituals, Ó Matko Lakšmí, dej mi dar!, was published in 2007.

For her candidate dissertation, Preinhaelterová analysed the disintegration of the Bengali joint family as depicted in the works of Ashapoorna Devi (1992). In 1997, her monograph Hinduista od zrozeni do zrozeni (The Hindu from Birth to Rebirth), depicted key stages in a Hindu person's life illustrated with specific cases. It was appreciated for its depth of coverage of the parameters of lives of Hindu women.

Preinhaelterová published a number of translations from modern Bengali literature into the Czech language. She concentrated on short stories by authors such as Ashapoorna Devi and Sunil Gangopadhyay. She also translated from Czech to Bengali.

On the occasion of her 70th birthday, a book of essays edited by Lubomír Ondračka, Mé zlaté Bengálsko: Studie k bengálskému náboženství a kultuře věnované Haně Preinhaelterové k jejím sedmdesátinám, was published in 2008.

Preinhaelterová died on 24 June 2018.

Selected works

Monographs

Translations

To Czech

To Bengali

References 

1938 births
2018 deaths
Charles University alumni
Translators to Bengali
Translators to Czech
People from České Budějovice